Breznica is a dispersed settlement in the hills northwest of Prevalje in the Carinthia region in northern Slovenia.

References

External links
Breznica on Geopedia

Populated places in the Municipality of Prevalje